Hyalobathra barnsalis is a moth in the family Crambidae. It was described by Pierre Viette in 1957. Its type locality is Bombaim. It is found on the island of São Tomé in São Tomé and Príncipe.

References

External links

Moths described in 1957
Pyraustinae
Taxa named by Pierre Viette
Fauna of São Tomé Island